Lead climbing (or leading) is a technique in rock climbing where the lead climber clips their rope to the climbing protection as they ascend the climbing route, while their second (or belayer) remains at the base of the route belaying the rope to protect the lead climber in the event that they fall.  The term is used to distinguish between the two roles, and the greater effort and increased risk, of the role of the lead climber.

Leading a climb is considered to be the opposite of top roping a climb, where even though there is still a second belaying the rope, the lead climber faces little or no risk in the event of a fall and does not need to clip into any protection as the rope is already anchored to the top of the route (i.e. if they fall off, they just hang from the rope).

Lead climbing can be performed as free climbing in a traditional climbing or a sport climbing format — leading a traditional climb is much riskier and physically demanding exercise for the climber.  Competition lead climbing is a sport climbing format that is part of the Olympic sport of competition climbing.  Lead climbing can also be performed as aid climbing.  The term is not generally applied to free solo climbing, as the free solo climber is already alone and thus there is no need to distinguish the role of leader from the second.

Descripton 

When leading a route, the lead climber clips their rope into the climbing protection as they progress.  If they are leading a traditional climbing route, the lead climber must arrange and insert temporary climbing protection as they climb.  If they are leading a sport climbing route, the climbing protection is already installed via pre-drilled bolts, into which the lead climber only needs to attach quickdraws.  Leading a traditional route is therefore a much riskier and physically demanding undertaking than leading a sport climbing route of the same grade.

Aside from the specific additional risks of traditional climbing, every lead climber faces the specific risk of falling twice the distance to their last point of climbing protection — i.e. if the lead climber was 3-metres above their last point of protection, then in a fall, they will fall over 6-metres, ending up 3-metres below their last point of protection.  This aspect of leading makes it a more physically demanding activity than top roping.

Leading a climb also requires good communication between the lead climber and the second who is belaying.  In particular, the lead climber will want to avoid the second holding the rope too tightly, which creates "rope drag" that acts like a downward force on the lead climber.  However, where the lead climber feels that a fall is imminent, they will want the second to quickly "take in" any slack in the rope so as to minimize the length of any fall.

First ascent

The act, and drive, to lead a climb is related to the definition of what is a first ascent (FA), or first free ascent (FFA) in the traditional and sport climbing formats.  The grades assigned to traditional and sport climbing routes are based on the climber leading the route, and not top roping it.  If a climber wants to test themselves at a specific technical grade, or set a new grade milestone, then they must lead the route.

Before the arrival of sport climbing in the early-1980s, traditional climbers frowned upon FFAs where the lead climber had practiced the route beforehand on a top rope (called headpointing), or worse still, practiced the crux moves from a hanging fixed rope (called hangdogging).  The arrival of sport climbing led to the development of the redpoint as the accepted definition of an FFA, which includes the practices of headpointing and hangdogging.  Where a lead climber can complete a route first-time and without any prior knowledge, it is called an onsight (or a flash if they had knowledge), and is still considered the most desireable form of ascent.

Equipment

Regardless of the format the lead climber is undertaking (i.e. traditional, sport, or aid), they will require a harness attached to one end of a dynamic kernmantle rope (usually via a figure-eight knot).  The second, who is belaying, will use a mechanical belay device that is clipped-into the rope, and which pays-out the rope as needed, but can grip the rope tightly to catch the leader in the event of a fall.

Where the lead climber is following a traditional climbing format, they will need to carry a range of protective equipment such as nuts, hexcentrics and tricams (known as "passive" protection), and/or spring-loaded camming devices (or "friends", and known as "active protection").  For a sport climbing format, the lead climber only needs to carry quickdraws to clip-into the bolts.

Risk

Aside from the specific risks involved in placing the temporary protection equipment while leading traditional climbing routes, the lead climber need to manage a number of general risk areas when leading:

 Runout is the distance from the lead climber to the last point of protection. The greater the runout, the greater the distance in any fall, and the greater the mental pressure on the climber.  Some leads involve runouts where any fall could result in a "ground-fall" (or the leader "hitting the deck").

 Back-clipping is where the rope is clipped into a quickdraw in such a way that the leader's end runs underneath the quickdraw carabiner as opposed to over the top of it; if the leader falls, the rope may fold directly over the carabiner gate, causing it to open with catastrophic consequences.

 Z-clipping is where the lead climber grabs the rope below an already clipped quickdraw and clips it into the next quickdraw, resulting in a "zig-zag" shape of the rope on the wall, which can create immense rope drag making further progress impossible until it is fixed.

 Turtling is where one of the lead climber's limbs is behind the rope when they fall off the route, which can result in the climber being "flipped" upside down (i.e. like a turtle on its back), which can eject the climber from their harness.

Multi-pitch leading

Longer climbing routes (e.g as in big wall climbing), are usually led in series of multiple pitches of circa  in length. In multi-pitch leading, the two climbers can swap the roles of lead climber and second on successive pitches.  The second needs to be comfortable working from a hanging belay, and both need to be familiar with the process for swapping between roles safely and efficiently.  Given that average pitch length will be longer, and that the weather potentially poorer, both climbers need to be clear in how they communicate with each other, and the climbing commands.

On long but easier routes, the climbing pair may use simul climbing, whereby both climbers simultaneously ascend the route.  The lead climber acts like on a normal lead climb however, the second does not remain belaying in a static position, but instead also climbs, removing/unclipping the protection equipment of the lead climber.  Both climbers are tied directly to the rope at all times, and both make sure that there are several points of protection in situ between them. Simul climbing is only performed on terrain both climbers are very comfortable on, as any fall is serious; often the stronger climber goes second.

Competition lead climbing 

The development of the safer format of sport climbing in the early 1980s led to rapid development in the sport of competition lead climbing.  The first major international lead climbing competition was held in Italy at Sportroccia in 1985.  By the late 1990s, competitive lead climbing was joined by competition bouldering, and competition speed climbing in what was to become the annual IFSC Climbing World Cup and biennial IFSC Climbing World Championships.  Competition lead climbing first appeared in the 2020 Summer Olympics for men's and women's medal events; it was structured in an unusual format of a single medal "combined" event of lead, bouldering and speed climbing, that was confusingly labeled as "sport climbing".

See also 
History of rock climbing
List of grade milestones in rock climbing

References 

Climbing techniques
Types of climbing
Climbing competitions